Wesley Pryor (birthdate Unknown) was an American baseball Third baseman in the pre-Negro leagues. He played mostly from 1908 to 1914 with several teams.

References

External links

Chicago American Giants players
Lincoln Giants players
Louisville White Sox (1914-1915) players
St. Louis Giants players
Schenectady Mohawk Giants players
Baseball infielders